The 2018 Honda Indy 200 was an IndyCar Series event held on July 29, 2018, at the Mid-Ohio Sports Car Course in Lexington, Ohio. The race served as the 13th round of the 2018 IndyCar Series season. 2016 Indy 500 champion Alexander Rossi qualified on pole position, and took victory in the 90-lap race. This race featured no DNFs.

Results

Qualifying 

Source for individual rounds:

Race 

Notes:
 Points include 1 point for leading at least 1 lap during a race, an additional 2 points for leading the most race laps, and 1 point for Pole Position.

Championship standings after the race 

Drivers' Championship standings

Manufacturer standings

 Note: Only the top five positions are included.

References

External links 

 Official Pit Stop Data

Honda Indy 200
Honda Indy 200
Honda Indy 200
Indy 200 at Mid-Ohio